Operator is a 2016 American comedy-drama film directed by Logan Kibens from a screenplay by Sharon Greene and Logan Kibens. It stars Martin Starr as Joe, a programmer and obsessive self-quantifier, and Mae Whitman as Emily, a budding comedy performer, who are a happily married couple until they decide to use one another in their work. Nat Faxon, Cameron Esposito, Retta, and Christine Lahti co-star. The film had its world premiere at the SXSW Film Festival on March 12, 2016 and was released by The Orchard on November 8, 2016.

Plot
Joe (Martin Starr) is a programmer with a crippling anxiety problem who is unable to deal with uncertainty. At work he is tasked with creating an interactive call center answering machine that can convey empathy. Joe recruits his wife Emily (Mae Whitman) who has the perfect voice for the system. Emily works at the front desk of a swanky hotel during the day and has an uncanny ability to soothe even the most irate guests (at night she performs with a comedy group at the Neo-Futurists). After years of being happily married, the pressures of work, family, and personal growth have strained their relationship. Emily sees this as an opportunity to reinvigorate their marriage and agrees to participate. What begins as a collaboration to strengthen their relationship quickly spirals out of control. Terrified of the uncertainty in their relationship, Joe becomes obsessed with creating the “perfect” version of his wife, becoming detached from the real Emily as he spends sleepless nights programming his automated Emily to fulfill his needs for sex and companionship. While Joe is losing touch with reality, Emily is losing faith in their future together. Joe will have to relinquish control and face the uncertainties of life if he wants to save their marriage.

Cast
 Martin Starr as Joe Larsen
 Mae Whitman as Emily Klein
 Nat Faxon as Gregg
 Cameron Esposito as Chloe Johnston
 Retta as Pauline "Roger" Rogers
 Christine Lahti as Beth Larsen

Production
Operator began filming in Chicago on June 29, 2015.

Release and reception
The film premiered to positive reviews at the South by Southwest festival on March 12, 2016. On May 25, 2016, it was announced that The Orchard had acquired distribution rights to the film.

On review aggregator Rotten Tomatoes, the film holds an approval rating of 100% based on 6 reviews, with an average rating of 7.19/10.

References

External links
 
 
 

2016 films
2016 romantic comedy-drama films
American romantic comedy-drama films
American independent films
Films about technological impact
Films set in Chicago
Films shot in Chicago
The Orchard (company) films
2016 independent films
2010s English-language films
2010s American films